Khanewal Junction railway station (Urdu and ) is located in the city of Khanewal, Punjab province of Pakistan. It is a major railway station of Pakistan Railways and the junction of Khanewal-Wazirabad branch railway line. It is the stop of all Express trains.

The station is staffed and has advance and current reservation offices. Food stalls are also located on it platforms.

Train routes

The routes are Khanewal from linked to Karachi, Lahore, Rawalpindi, Peshawar, Quetta, Multan, Faisalabad, Sargodha, Jhang, Hyderabad, Sibi, Sukkur, Attock, Rahim Yar Khan, Bahawalpur, Gujrat, Gujranwala, Rohri, Jacobabad, Nawabshah and Nowshera.

Train services from Khanewal Jn

Contact Information
City code of Khanewal is 065 and official phone number of Khanewal Junction railway station is 9200312.

See also
 List of railway stations in Pakistan
 Pakistan Railways

References

External links

Railway stations in Khanewal District
Railway stations on Lodhran–Khanewal Branch Line
Railway stations on Khanewal–Wazirabad Line
Railway stations on Karachi–Peshawar Line (ML 1)